NHL 2002 is a video game released by EA Sports in 2001. It is the predecessor to NHL 2003. The game's cover man is Pittsburgh Penguins superstar and owner Mario Lemieux, who had just made a comeback after being retired for three and a half years. It was the first installment of the NHL series to be released on Xbox.

Features
Bill Clement is replaced by Don Taylor for NHL 2002. Taylor's quirky and often slapstick commentary style drew mixed reception from fans of the game.

GBA version
NHL 2002 was the only game in the series to be released on the Game Boy Advance. This version is an updated port of NHL 96 for the SNES, and contains many features from that past title.

Reception

The PlayStation 2 version received "universal acclaim", while the rest of the console versions received "generally favorable reviews", according to the review aggregation website Metacritic. Jim Preston of NextGens December 2001 issue said of the PS2 version, "Only frustrating defensive controls mar another brilliant effort from EA Sports." The magazine later said of the Xbox version in its final issue, "the only real issue we have is that the game's defensive AI is rather flawed, somewhat marring an otherwise incredible experience." In Japan, where the former console version was ported for release on February 7, 2002, Famitsu gave it a score of 29 out of 40.

Kevin Krause of GameZone gave the PS2 version 9.1 out of 10, calling it "A landmark release in that it is the first PS2 game to support Dolby™ Pro Logic and DTS™ sound. These surround sound technologies allow for realistic environmental surround sound like you've never heard it before." Kevin "Biff" Giacobbi gave the PC version 9 out of 10, calling it "A great game, but true hockey fans that buy the latest and greatest that EA gives us each year will not see a whole lot of changes." Christopher Allen of AllGame gave the same PC version three-and-a-half stars out of five, however, saying, "Despite the unwise decision to hire Don Taylor, NHL 2002 will appeal more to the arcade action camp than the purist. While most of the new additions don't work as well as planned, it is encouraging to see fresh ideas implemented. NHL 2002 is fun to play, but isn't particularly true to the sport, which may disturb true hockey fans with its slip away from realism."

The staff of Computer Games Magazine nominated the game as the best sports game of 2001, but ultimately gave the award to High Heat Baseball 2002. It was also a runner-up in GameSpots annual award category for the best traditional sports console game, which went to NBA 2K2.

References

External links
 
 

2001 video games
Electronic Arts games
Game Boy Advance games
PlayStation 2 games
Xbox games
Windows games
NHL (video game series)
EA Sports games
Video games scored by Rom Di Prisco
Video games scored by Saki Kaskas
Video games scored by Stuart Chatwood
Video games set in 2001
Video games set in 2002
Video games set in the United States
Video games set in Canada
Video games developed in Canada
Budcat Creations games
Multiplayer and single-player video games